Šamsi was an Arab queen who reigned in the Ancient Near East, in the 8th century BCE. She succeeded Queen Zabibe (Arabic meaning "Raisin"). Tiglath-Pileser III, son of Ashur-nirari V and king of Assyria, was the first foreign ruler to bring the Arabs under his control. When Šamsi rebelled against him by joining an alliance forged by Rakhianu of Damascus, Pileser attacked and defeated Samsi, made her and her alliance partners surrender, and pay a tribute to remain in power. She ruled for 20 years and her successor was Queen Iatie, in about 700 BC.

History
The Assyrian chronicles describe Queen Šamsi as a powerful ruler who was bold enough to face the Assyrian kings in the 730s and 720s. She and others are mentioned as rulers of the regions far to the west of Assyria who were aware of the Assyrian kings and had trade with them in spices Šamsi and her predecessor and successor queens had led embassies and caravans carrying spices and incense to the Near East and Syria from the Arabian Peninsula.

Šamsi had come to power as a vassal of Assyria, succeeding the former Arabian queen Zabibe, who had abdicated in Šamsi's favour. Zabibe's oath of allegiance was continued by Šamsi on taking the throne; she swore by the sun, the god of Arabia, that she would be loyal to Assyria. Tiglath-Pileser gave formal recognition to this accession. Later, however, she changed her mind and rebelled, joining an alliance made by Rezin of Damascus to fight the Assyrian king Tiglath-Pileser III in 732 BCE.

The Assyrian army under King Tiglath-Pileser III (ruled 745–727 BCE) had recently subjugated the land of Edom and now turned its attention to the anti-Assyrian forces in Arabia and the Levant. According to the Assyrian records, Tiglath-Pileser attacked many Arab tribal areas and defeated Šamsi in the neighborhood of Mount Sa-qu-ur-ri (a place not identified). The Assyrians took many prisoners of war, 30,000 camels, and more than 20,000 oxen as booty. An inscription records that 9,400 of her soldiers were killed, and in addition 5,000 bags of various types of spices, altars of gods, armaments including an ornamental staff of her goddess, and her estates were seized. As she fled to the desert, Tiglath-Pileser set fire to the remaining tents at the battle site.

After her defeat, Šamsi was said by the Assyrian chroniclers to have fled the battlefield like a "wild she-ass of the desert". She did not remain at liberty for long, as she was soon captured and brought as prisoner to Tiglath-Pileser. He appointed a qepu or governor over her and 10,000 soldiers, and restored her to her kingdom. It is also said that she had escaped to the land of Bazu/Basu and later surrendered.  The terms of surrender to Tiglath-Pileser involved a tribute to be paid by Šamsi. The Assyrians chose to restore her as they needed a pliable Arab ruler in order to maintain the lucrative north–south trade route from Assyrian territory across Arabia. Seven other kingdoms involved in Arabian commerce were also required to pay tribute and provide security to their incense trade; these seven kingdoms were Massa, Tyma, Saba, Haiappa (Ephah), Badana, Hattia, and Idibi'lu. The tribute agreed to be paid by the Arabs included gold, silver, male and female camels, and all types of spices.

See also
 Dumat al-Jandal
Arab queens

References

Bibliography

 
 
 
 
 
 
 

Arab queens
Women in ancient Near Eastern warfare
Ancient queens regnant
8th-century BC women rulers
8th-century BC Arabs
Year of birth missing
Year of death missing
History of Saudi Arabia

Female generals
Arab generals
8th-century BC rulers